Vanilla bahiana is an endangered species of vanilla orchid that is restricted to Brazil.  It is a natural source of vanillin and is closely related to Vanilla planifolia, a main producer of vanilla.

References

External links

bahiana
Endemic orchids of Brazil
Flora of Bahia
Plants described in 1950